Video of the Year (最優秀ロックビデオ賞)

Results
The following table displays the nominees and the winners in bold print with a yellow background.

2000s

2010s

See also
MTV Video Music Award for Video of the Year

Awards established in 2002
2002 establishments in Japan